Crystal River State Archaeological Site is a  Florida State Park located on the Crystal River and within the Crystal River Preserve State Park. The park is located two miles (3 km) northwest of the city of Crystal River, on Museum Point off U.S. 19/98.

Under the title of Crystal River Indian Mounds, it is also a U.S. National Historic Landmark (designated as such on September 29, 1970).

History
The park contains a six-mound complex, occupied from the Deptford period through Santa Rosa-Swift Creek culture and up to the Late Fort Walton period. This timespan makes it one of the longest continually occupied sites in Florida, believed to have been occupied for 1,600 years. Native Americans traveled long distances to the complex to bury their dead and to engage in trading activities. An estimated 7,500 people may have visited the complex annually when it was occupied. The complex contains burial mounds, temple/platform mounds, a plaza area, and a midden. The earliest burials at the site are believed to be located in the conical mound and date back to about 250 BC. Many of the people buried in this mound had copper tools and ornaments buried with them. The copper artifacts came from the Ohio River area through a trade network developed by the Hopewell culture that existed at the time. There seemed to be indirect trading between the people who lived here and the Hopewell culture. People that were buried later did not have this type of artifacts buried with them and some burials do not contain artifacts. This tells us that over the 2,000 years that ancient people used the site, burial practices and ceremonies changed. It also tells us that trading with the northern portions of North America changed. The shell and sand ring also contains burials some of which were placed between layers of shells while others were not. It is not clear why this occurred or whether it was related to status or just a change in the burial customs. The platform was constructed as burials filled in the gap between the ring and the cone. It is estimated that about 1,200 to 1,500 people are buried in this complex.

Over a period of approximately 1,900 years, beginning about 500 BC, the Native Americans at the Crystal River Site threw away great quantities of materials that would form the middens that adorn the site. This "midden material" contained various kinds of woodland animal bones, fish bones, turtle shells, broken pottery, broken hand tools and arrowheads. By the time of abandonment, the midden area had reached  in length,  in width,  in depth, and was formed into a crescent shape. Two large platform mounds are believed to have been used primarily for ceremonial purposes. A  paved loop trail passes by each mound, with signs interpreting the mounds. A 55 step observation deck atop the park's largest mound, Temple Mound, provides a panoramic view of the area.  The park contains coastal marsh and is part of the Great Florida Birding Trail.

The park is also home to a limestone slab, possibly a "stele", on which is a crudely carved human face and torso. This is odd because the slab is one that is not found on other mound sites except in locations such as the Caribbean, South America, and Central America. At this particular site there were at least four of these large stones placed by the inhabitants in their ancient time. This carving shows that the person represented possessed long hair in a plume over the left shoulder. There has been debate as to how strongly this inscribed stone slab was influenced by the monumental stelae of Mesoamerica.  Although there may be some evidence for contact between the Huastec Culture of the Mexican Gulf Coast and the American Southeast, those claims which suggest the most direct connections are probably unfounded. The slab is today housed on the site within a metal cage.

Roberts Island
The Roberts Island complex succeeded the Crystal River site as a ceremonial center in the 9th and 10th centuries.

Recreational activities
Activities include salt and fresh water fishing, picnicing, bird watching and a boat tour of Crystal River. Amenities include a small picnic area. The visitor center/museum features an open captioned video about the tribes that once lived in the area, and houses a collection of artifacts from the site, including arrowheads, pottery, jewelry, stone and bone tools.  A centerpiece diorama dominates the interior of the museum, depicting a scale model of the site as it may have looked centuries before its abandonment.

See also
Mound
Mound builder (people)
Earthwork (archaeology)

References

Further reading
Thomas J. Pluckhahn, Victor D. Thompson. New Histories of Village Life at Crystal River. Florida Museum of Natural History: Ripley P. Bullen Series. Gainesville University of Florida Press, 2018. .

External links

 
 Crystal River State Archaeological Site pictures at Florida Center for Instructional Technology

Swift Creek culture
South Appalachian Mississippian culture
Native American museums in Florida
Museums in Citrus County, Florida
Archaeological museums in Florida
Archaeological sites in Florida
National Historic Landmarks in Florida
State parks of Florida
Parks in Citrus County, Florida
Protected areas established in 1970
Archaeological parks
Florida Native American Heritage Trail
Crystal River, Florida
Mounds in Florida
Native American history of Florida
National Register of Historic Places in Citrus County, Florida
1970 establishments in Florida